Panteleimon or Panteley may refer to:

People
 Pantaleon, also called Panteleimon, king in Bactria and India (reigned  BC)
 Saint Pantaleon, also called Saint Panteleimon
 Panteley Dimitrov, Bulgarian football midfielder
 Panteley Kiselov, Bulgarian soldier and general 
 Panteleimon Golosov, Russian Constructivist architect and brother of Ilya Golosov
 Panteleimon Kotokos, Greek Orthodox bishop
 Panteleimon Kulish, Ukrainian writer 
 Panteleimon Ponomarenko, general in the Red Army 
 Panteleimon Romanov, Russian/Soviet writer
 Panteleimon Sudzhaksky, Bulgarian Orthodox monk
 Cary-Hiroyuki Tagawa (Panteleimon Tagawa), Japanese-American-Russian actor

Places
 Paralia Panteleimonos (Beach of Panteleimon), a settlement of the former municipal district of Panteleimonas
 Panteleimon, Kilkis, a village in the Kilkis regional unit, Greece
 Panteleimon Kulish Gymnasium, a high school in Borzna, Ukraine

Religious buildings
 Church of Saint Panteleimon of Acharnai, central Athens, Greece
 Church of St. Panteleimon (Nerezi), North Macedonia
 Church of Saint Panteleimon (Thessaloniki), Greece
 St. Panteleimon's Cathedral, in the Kievan neighbourhood of Theophania
 St. Panteleimon Monastery, on Mount Athos, Greece
 St. Panteleimon Monastery (Myrtou), Cyprus
 Church of St. Panteleimon, Mirkovci, Croatia

See also
 Pantelej (disambiguation)
 Pantaleon (disambiguation)
 Pantaleyev (disambiguation)

Slavic masculine given names
Bulgarian masculine given names
Ukrainian masculine given names
Russian masculine given names

ru:Пантелей